Jana Nell (born 28 February 1990) is a South African cricketer who plays as an all-rounder, batting right-handed and bowling right-arm off break. In 2010, she played two One Day Internationals three Twenty20 Internationals for South Africa, all in the ICC Women's Cricket Challenge. She plays domestic cricket for Eastern Province.

In 2013, in a 50-over match for Eastern Province against Kei, Nell took 8 wickets for 7 runs from 7.4 overs to help bowl the opposition out for just 28.

References

External links
 
 

1990 births
Living people
Cricketers from Port Elizabeth
South African women cricketers
South Africa women One Day International cricketers
South Africa women Twenty20 International cricketers
Eastern Province women cricketers